Gowidon is a genus of arboreal lizards in the family Agamidae. It is monotypic with a single recognised species, Gowidon longirostris, commonly known as the long-snouted lashtail or long-nosed water dragon. It is found in Northern Territory, Queensland, South Australia, Western Australia,  Australia, and in New Guinea.

Taxonomy
It was first described in 1883 by George Boulenger as Lophognathus longirostris, and was transferred to the genus, Gowidon, in 2014 by Hal Cogger. The taxonomic decision for synonymy is given by Cogger in 1983.

References

 
Lizard genera
Agamid lizards of Australia
Agamid lizards of New Guinea
Taxa named by Richard Walter Wells
Taxa named by Cliff Ross Wellington
Taxa named by George Albert Boulenger
Taxobox binomials not recognized by IUCN 
Monotypic lizard genera